IKM–Manning Community School District is a rural public school district headquartered at IKM–Manning Middle and High School in Manning, Iowa. In addition to Manning, the district name also refers to the municipalities of Irwin, Kirkman, and Manilla.

The district is located in sections of Audubon, Carroll, Crawford, and Shelby counties. It serves all of the municipalities of Manning, Irwin, Kirkman, Manilla, and Aspinwall. A small section of Templeton lies within the district boundaries.

History

It was established on July 1, 2011, from the merger of the Manning Community School District and the IKM Community School District. The merger vote, held on Tuesday April 6, 2010, was in favor of consolidation: the vote tallies were 477–20 at the Manning polling station, 206–26 at the Irwin polling station, and 190–20 at the Manilla polling station.

The district was previously headquartered in Manilla.

Trevor Miller has served as superintendent since 2017, and the district entered a sharing agreement with Exira–EHK to split his time 50/50. In 2020, the districts modified the agreement for the 2020–21 to split his time 80/20 with 4 days per week at Exira–EHK and a single day per week at IKM–Manning.

Schools
The district operates two schools: IKM–Manning Elementary School in Irwin, and IKM–Manning Middle and High School.

The Manning campus, which once had both elementary and high school grades, at one time had about 550 students.

The district previously operated a middle school in Manilla but it closed in 2014; at the time the district continued to have its headquarters there.

IKM–Manning High School

Athletics
The Wolves compete in the Western Iowa Conference in the following sports:
Cross country
Volleyball
Football
Basketball
 Girls' 2009 class 2A state champions
Wrestling
Track and field
Golf
Soccer
Baseball
Softball

See also
List of school districts in Iowa
List of high schools in Iowa

References

External links
 IKM–Manning Community School District
 "Iowa School District Profiles IKM-Manning." Iowa State University Department of Economics, June 2013.

School districts in Iowa
Education in Audubon County, Iowa
Education in Carroll County, Iowa
Education in Crawford County, Iowa
Education in Shelby County, Iowa
2011 establishments in Iowa
School districts established in 2011